Adam H. Russell is an American anthropologist serving as the acting deputy director of the Advanced Research Projects Agency for Health since June 6, 2022. He is chief scientist of the Applied Research Laboratory for Intelligence and Security at the University of Maryland.

Life 
Russell completed a Bachelor of Arts in Cultural Anthropology from Duke University, and an M.Phil. and a D.Phil. in Social Anthropology from University of Oxford, where he was a Rhodes Scholar. He played with the Oxford University RFC for four varsity matches and also worked with the United States national rugby union team, and worked as High Performance director for the United States women's national rugby union team in the 2014 and 2017 Women's Rugby World Cups.

Russell was in industry, where he was a senior scientist and principal investigator on a wide range of human performance and social science research projects and provided strategic assessments for a number of different government organizations. Russell joined  Intelligence Advanced Research Projects Activity (IARPA) as a program manager. He developed and managed a number of high-risk, high-payoff research projects for the Office of the Director of National Intelligence. Russell joined DARPA as a program manager in July 2015. His work there focused on new experimental platforms and tools to facilitate discovery, quantification and "big validation" of fundamental measures in social science, behavioral science and human performance.

Russell is the chief scientist of the Applied Research Laboratory for Intelligence and Security at the University of Maryland.

In 2022, secretary Xavier Becerra selected Russell to serve as the acting deputy director for the Advanced Research Projects Agency for Health (ARPA-H), effective June 6. In this role, Russell leads the process to stand up ARPA-H.

References 

Living people
Place of birth missing (living people)
Year of birth missing (living people)
University of Maryland, College Park faculty
21st-century American anthropologists
21st-century American scientists
Biden administration personnel
United States Department of Defense officials
National Institutes of Health people
Duke University alumni
Oxford University RFC players
American Rhodes Scholars